The Hippodrome of Olympia housed the equestrian contests (horse racing and chariot racing) of the Ancient Olympic Games. According to Pausanias, it was situated to the south of the Stadium and covered a large area about 600 meters long and 200 meters wide.  The hippodrome was a wide, flat, open space where the starting point and the finish line were designated with a pole and a second smaller pole called nyssa designated the turning point.

Horse and chariot races were one of the most popular and spectacular sports of the Olympic Games in ancient Greece.  The equestrian sports of the time were the tethrippon, the apene, the synoris, the tethrippon for foals, the synoris for foals, the perfect keles race, the kalpe and the pole horse race. According to mythology, the first chariot race took place in Olympia between King Pelops and King Oenomaus of Pisa.  In the ancient Olympic Games the jockeys were not the owners of the horses.  The owners of the horses were declared winners, they were awarded the wreath and enjoyed all the honors although they did not take part in the race. The jockeys won only a small portion from the glory of the winner, such as a wool band that the owner would tie on their head.

The hippodrome of ancient Olympia had a complex starting mechanism in order to avoid false starts. The starting mechanism was designed by the statue maker Kleoitas and was later improved by Aristidis. According to Pausanias, the required energy for the movement of the mechanism came from the drop of a bronze dolphin and the rise of a bronze eagle.

Today, the hippodrome does not exist. Some claim that it was washed away by the river Alfeios while others claim that its location is to the southeast of the Stadium.

References

External links

Ancient Olympia
Ancient Olympic Games